The Yukon Progressive Conservative Party was a conservative political party in Yukon, Canada. It was succeeded by the Yukon Party.

History
The Yukon Progressive Conservative Party was founded in April 1978. Long time Yukon legislator Hilda Watson was elected the party's first leader defeating Yukon MP Erik Nielsen by one vote. Watson had been a member of the territorial Legislative Council since 1970, and became the first woman in Canadian history to lead a political party into a general election. However, she was unable to win a seat in the 1978 election, and consequently resigned. Chris Pearson became leader of the party as well as the government.

The Progressive Conservatives were defeated in the 1985 election by the Yukon New Democratic Party (NDP) led by Tony Penikett. With Prime Minister Brian Mulroney's Progressive Conservative federal government's increasing unpopularity, the Yukon Progressive Conservatives decided to sever their relations with the federal Conservatives, and renamed themselves the "Yukon Party" prior to the 1992 election.

Election results

Leaders
Hilda Watson 1978
Chris Pearson 1978-1979 (interim), 1978-1985
Willard Phelps 1985-1991

References

See also
List of premiers of Yukon
List of Yukon Leaders of Opposition
Yukon Party

Political parties established in 1978
Political parties disestablished in 1992
Territorial political parties in Yukon
Conservative parties in Canada
1978 establishments in Yukon